Cerdido is a municipality of northwestern Spain in the province of A Coruña, in the autonomous community of Galicia. It belongs to the comarca of Ortegal.

Industry 

Farming and timber production, together with services, are the main economic activities. Wind-mill parks are common in Ferrolterra, particularly in the boroughs of Carino, Cedeira and A Capelada.

Climate

Due to its geographical proximity to the Atlantic Ocean, Cerdido does not have extreme oscillation in its weather conditions in winter or in summer. The weather is mild year-round, unlike the weather in other parts of the Iberian Peninsula. Like the rest of Galicia, it is rainy and beautifully green, and unlike other parts of Ferrolterra, in winter time snow can be found in most parts of the borough.

References

External links
  Site devoted to the art of landscape and nature of Ferrolterra

Municipalities in the Province of A Coruña